Actinobole uliginosum, the flannel cudweed, is a species of dwarf annual herb in the family Asteraceae, which is endemic to Australia. It occurs in every state of mainland Australia.

Habitat/ecology
Flannel cudweed is found on sandy, loamy and granitic soils in a variety of habitats throughout inland Australia.

References

External links
 JSTOR Global Plants: Actinobole uliginosum.
 The International Plant Names Index: Actinobole uliginosum. 

Gnaphalieae
Asterales of Australia
Taxa named by Asa Gray